The statistics on international films' Box Office in Malaysia has started in 2008. Box Office Mojo is the only website that provides the box office numbers for international films released in Malaysia. However, this does not include the numbers for local films. For top local films gross, please view Cinema of Malaysia. Box Office - Yahoo! Malaysia and Cinema Online Malaysia are two current websites that show the ranking of films weekly inclusive of local films, but not providing any box office number. Golden Screen Cinemas (GSC) also provide only the ranking of both local and international films weekly, based on the popularity at its own cinema. The ranking can be accessed at the right bottom corner of GSC's website.

Highest-grossing local films in Malaysia
Below is the list of top 10 highest-grossing local films ever in Malaysia.

List of grossing local films

, Mat Kilau: Kebangkitan Pahlawan is currently the highest-grossing local film (and overall) of all time in Malaysia.

Highest-grossing international films in Malaysia
Below is the list of top 50 highest-grossing international films ever in Malaysia.
 Note: All grosses are based on the final week of the film in local theatres and taken in estimation of local currency, as different rates between USD and Ringgit of Malaysia applied every week.

List of grossing international films

Background colour  indicates films that are currently in cinema

Transformers: Dark of the Moon grossed RM34,661,020 but due to the exchange rates, United International Pictures claimed that the film banked in a total of RM37,252,441.

^^ Note 2: Including the total gross of the re-release of the special edition.

 Note 3: Films that are currently running in theatres nationwide.

Highest opening weekend films in history

Below is the list of the 30 biggest opening weekend of all time in Malaysia. As of 4 August 2019, Avengers: Endgame has the biggest opening weekend of all time in Malaysia, grossing RM 41,835,999 in the opening weekend alone and surpassed RM 10,000,000 on the opening day itself

 As of 4 August 2019

^ Note 1: Furious 7 grossed RM20,769,458 on its opening weekend from Thursday to Sunday. However, if include sneak previews from 9pm onward on Wednesday, it opened to a total of RM26,623,534.

^^ Note 2: Avengers: Age of Ultron grossed RM17,876,018 on its opening weekend from Thursday to Sunday. If include sneak previews from Wednesday midnight onward, it opened to RM19,351,790.

^^^ Note 3: Iron Man 3 was considered to have higher opening weekend as it was a 3-day opening weekend compared to Transformers: Dark of the Moon 4-day opening weekend. The list ranks the films according to the total gross of opening weekend regardless of total days of opening weekend.

List of highest-grossing Indian films

2.0 holds the record for the biggest opening day (MYR 2,730,000) and the biggest opening weekend of any Indian movie in Malaysia.

Highest-grossing animated films in Malaysia
Below is the list of top 50 highest-grossing animated films ever in Malaysia.

List of grossing animated films
Frozen II is currently the highest-grossing animated film in Malaysia for both local and international film.
Background colour  indicates films that are currently in cinema

Year to year international films box office in Malaysia
For list of highest-grossing local production films in history: Highest-grossing local production films.

The historical box office record in Malaysia was made by Furious 7 in April 2015, which held the 4-day opening record of RM26,623,534 and the highest-grossing film of RM60,659,547. In 2012, while The Avengers broke the best Friday opening day gross of all time, it was unable to break Transformers: Dark of the Moon 4-day weekend opening record gross, making RM10,050,983 from 26 to 29 April 2012. On 28 April 2014, Iron Man 3 broke a new 3-day opening record by grossing RM14,263,206. The film later surpassed Transformers: Dark of the Moon to be the highest-grossing film of all time, earning a gross of RM45,268,519 until Furious 7 took the crown after becoming the first film to gross over RM50 million. Transformers: Dark of the Moon was the first film to break US$10 million in Malaysia - $10,881,761. The film was retained in the cinema for 15 weeks.

Year 2007
Transformers grossed more than $5 million in cinemas. It was retained in cinemas for a total of 14 weeks.

 Note: Total gross are retrieved based on estimation from Box Office Mojo.

Tamil Movies

Year 2008
The top film in Malaysia for year 2008 was CJ7 Cheung Gong 7 Hou which grossed RM11,715,385. This was the only year when a non-Hollywood movie became the highest-grossing film in Malaysia.

Chinese Movies

Tamil Movies

Year 2009
In 2009, Transformers: Revenge of the Fallen topped the box office, grossing RM28,154,004, which was a record in Malaysia box office. It was later surpassed by its own sequel, Transformers: Dark of the Moon in 2011.

Chinese Movies

Tamil Movies

Year 2010
In year 2010, the top film was Avatar, which made RM26,159,953 including RM1,123,320 of its 3D-reissued on 25 August 2010. Not counting the re-released version, the original film was one of the film that was retained the most longest in cinema, for a total of 29 weeks.

Chinese Movies

Tamil Movies

Year 2011
The highest-grossing film was Transformers: Dark of the Moon that made RM34,661,020, which was one of the biggest record in Malaysia's film industry. It was also the only film that made over $10 million (USD) in 2011 and in Malaysia's Box Office history. Followed by this were Kung Fu Panda 2 and Mission: Impossible – Ghost Protocol grossing RM18,048,666 and RM17,297,093 respectively. In 2012, The Avengers became the second film after Transformers: Dark of the Moon to earn more than $10 million (USD) in Malaysia's Box Office.

 Note: The final actual grossing of Transformers: Dark of the Moon was RM 37,252,441 (claimed by United International Pictures Malaysia), but the number was adjusted at week 14 release of the film due to difference in currency exchange, leading to official number of RM 34,661,020 stated in Box Office Mojo. Including local film KL Gangster which grossed about RM 12,978,352, it should be ranking #9 just above Thor.

Chinese Movies

Tamil Movies

Year 2012

In 2012, the top film was The Avengers which grossed RM33,983,208, followed by The Amazing Spider-Man, grossing RM21,993,313. On 8 July, The Amazing Spider-Man surpassed The Avengers (RM10,050,983) to score the best opening weekend this year with RM10,107,973. However, The Avengers still scored the biggest Friday's single opening day gross of the year. Both are still unable to top Transformers: Dark of the Moon with advance ticketing sales and more addition of midnight shows. The Avengers was retained in cinema for 15 weeks. On 22 July, The Dark Knight Rises opened to RM6,972,371, which is more than double the debut of The Dark Knight, RM3,249,930 back in 2008. The Dark Knight Rises was the second film retained the longest in cinema for 17 weeks while Madagascar 3: Europe's Most Wanted was the animated film retained the longest in cinema for 24 weeks in 2012.

Chinese Movies

Tamil Movies

Year 2013
Both CZ12 and The Hobbit: An Unexpected Journey continued their strength from last year holiday weekend to dominate the box office for several weeks consecutively. Heading into January, CZ12 broke record by becoming the second-highest-grossing Chinese film in Malaysia, earning RM20,278,439. It is also the Jackie Chan's highest-grossing film in local box office. Meanwhile, The Hobbit: An Unexpected Journey had grossed RM15,100,342. It was basically higher than The Lord of the Rings Trilogy. The top film of the year in Malaysia was Iron Man 3, grossing RM45,268,519. It had officially become the first film ever to gross over RM40 million. This was followed by Fast & Furious 6 which grossed a total of RM31,462,780. On 26 April, Iron Man 3 broke the highest opening day record previously held by The Avengers. It also opened to RM14,263,206, which was the highest opening record for 3 days opening after advance ticketing showed a strong selling out. On 4 July, Despicable Me 2 broke the highest opening weekend record for an animated film which was previously held by Kung Fu Panda 2. The minion comedy opened to RM5,596,983 even after a strong RM1,098,734 limited sneak previews from its previous weekend, which was higher than Kung Fu Panda 2s RM5,025,339 back in 2011. Meanwhile, directed by Malaysian director James Wan, The Conjuring is the highest-grossing horror film ever in Malaysia with RM11,800,000 until it was later surpassed by its own spin-off Annabelle in 2014.

Note: By comparing opening gross, Transformers: Dark of the Moon still hold the best opening weekend with RM 14.8 million while Iron Man 3 trailed behind with RM 13.8 million. However, with inflation and IMAX boost, Iron Man 3 could be considered scoring the best opening weekend since it had already grossed RM 13.8 million in just 3 days. The opening record for Transformers: Dark of the Moon was a 4 days opening record. All of the records were later surpassed by Transformers: Age of Extinction, Furious 7 and Avengers: Age of Ultron. Meanwhile, in terms of US dollar, Hansel and Gretel: Witch Hunters grossed less than Oz: The Great and Powerful.

Chinese Movies

Tamil Movies

Year 2014

Transformers: Age of Extinction is the highest-grossing film of the year with a stunning gross of RM44,081,548. The robots adventure broke all of its predecessors' opening records, earning RM21,421,683 on its first weekend of release. The total gross of box office on that weekend was RM22,800,872, marking the biggest opening weekend of the year in local box office and has once again proven how popular is Transformers franchise here. It is followed by The Amazing Spider-Man 2 with a tremendous gross of RM29,893,163. It scored the second-best opening weekend of the year, shattering the previous record held by Transformers: Dark of the Moon, grossing RM14,947,576, which was also a significant improvement over The Amazing Spider-Mans opening weekend of RM10,107,973. In third, Captain America: The Winter Soldier grossed a total of RM27,083,626, which was three times bigger than Captain America: The First Avenger back in 2011.

Tamil Movies

Year 2015
The three top films were Furious 7, Avengers: Age of Ultron and Jurassic World with each grossing above RM40 million for a combination total of RM160 million. Furious 7 surprised local box office by its outstanding performance, breaking all of the records held by Transformers and The Avengers franchise. It opened to RM20,769,458 on its opening weekend and RM26,623,534, if inclusive of sneak previews beginning at 9pm on Wednesday. It is the highest-grossing film of the year with a shocking RM60,659,547, marking the first film to fly pass RM50 million in local box office history. Avengers: Age of Ultron followed at #2, its opening weekend of RM17,816,018 was the second-highest opening weekend of the year and nearly doubled of The Avengerss opening weekend back in 2012. Coming in third is Jurassic World with a RM48,511,938.

Tamil Movies

Year 2016

 As of 26 January 2019.

Tamil Movies

Year 2017
 As of 21 January 2018.

Tamil Movies

Year 2018

 As of 26 January 2019.

Tamil Movies

Year 2019

As of 22 December 2019

Tamil Movies

Year 2020
All figures provided are from Box Office Mojo. Due to the COVID-19 pandemic affecting globally since the early 2020s, cinemas were forced to be shut down multiple times and it massively affected box office in Malaysia as well as around the world. During days where cinemas were allowed to operate strict restrictions and regulations were placed. (As of 27 December 2022)

Year 2021
All figures provided are from Box Office Mojo. (As of 27 December 2022)

Year 2022
All figures provided are from Box Office Mojo. (As of 19 March 2023)

Background colour  indicates films that are currently in cinema

Year 2023
All figures provided are from Box Office Mojo. (As of 19 March 2023)

Background colour  indicates films that are currently in cinema

See also
 List of films released in Malaysia
 Cinema of Malaysia

References

External links
 Box Office Mojo Website
 Box Office - Yahoo! Malaysia
 Cinema Online Malaysia
 Golden Screen Cinemas official website
 Tanjong Golden Village's official website
 Cathay Cineplexes official website
 MBO's official website
 Big Cinemas official website
 Malaysia national film development website

Lists of Malaysian films
Malaysia